Borislav Dimitrachkov (born 1 June 1968) is a Bulgarian alpine skier. He competed at the 1988 Winter Olympics and the 1992 Winter Olympics.

References

1968 births
Living people
Bulgarian male alpine skiers
Olympic alpine skiers of Bulgaria
Alpine skiers at the 1988 Winter Olympics
Alpine skiers at the 1992 Winter Olympics